"Take Me to the Country" is a song recorded by American country music artist, Mel McDaniel. It was released in March 1982 as the second single from McDaniel's album Take Me to the Country.  It peaked at number 10 on the U.S. Billboard Hot Country Singles & Tracks chart and at number 22 on the Canadian RPM Country Tracks chart. It was written by Ronny Scaife, Don Singleton and Larry Rogers.

Chart performance

References

1982 singles
Mel McDaniel songs
Capitol Records Nashville singles
Songs written by Ronny Scaife
1982 songs